The Whitefin is a 92-foot sailing super yacht, racing in the "Spirit of Tradition" class.

Career 
Whitefin was built between 1983 and 1984 in Camden, Maine, USA, by owner/builder Phil Long who, for the project, used the Renaissance Yacht shipyard he had created a few years before, to build the yacht Whitehawk.

Both boats were designed by Californian designer Bruce King, who, after having established a reputation creating many successful, innovative ocean racing and cruising boats, moved from Newport Harbor, California, to Maine, to work on the Whitehawk project and, later, on the Whitefin project. These, for King, were just the beginning of a series of successful sailing maxi yachts like Signe (1990 - again with Renaissance Yachts), Hetairos (1993), Alejandra (1993), Sophie (1994 - again with Renaissance Yachts), Antonisa (1999), Maria Cattiva (2002) and Scheherazade (2003).

Between 2000 and 2002, after almost twenty years had passed from her launch, Whitefin was given by her latest owner, Mr. Alfredo Canessa (who bought her from Pasquale Natuzzi), an eighteen months refitting, which brought her up to date with the most recent technology, in full respect of her original layout, both above and below deck, allowing her to win the most prestigious trophies in the most important regattas for her category, the Spirit of Tradition, such as: the Maxi Yacht Rolex Cup in
Portocervo, Sardinia; the Vele d’Epoca di Imperia, Trofeo Prada or Trofeo Panerai, in Imperia, Liguria; and Les Voiles de Saint-Tropez, in Saint Tropez, France.

With the advent of the actual ownership, from December 2014 to April 2015 Whitefin has undergone a deep upgrade preparing her to a new season of regattas.

Whitefin is currently available for luxury charter.

Honours 
The yacht's name is bound to the following international trophies: Maxi Yacht Rolex Cup 2002 (2nd classified), Vele d'Epoca di Imperia Trofeo Prada 2002 (1st classified), Maxi Yacht Rolex Cup 2003 (1st classified), Vele d'Epoca di Imperia Trofeo Prada 2004 (1st classified), Maxi Yacht Rolex Cup 2005 (2nd classified), Vele d'Epoca di Imperia Trofeo Panerai 2006 (3rd classified), Cannes Régates Royales 2015 (2nd classified), TAG Heur VELA Cup 2016 and 2017 (1st classified).

Description 
Whitefin is built up in the WEST system fashion of multiple plies, precisely
six plies each made up of 1-inch thick boards. The innermost ply and the four
successive plies are Maine white cedar, while the outermost ply, laid longitudinally,
is Port Orford (Oregon) Cedar.
If the outside is state-of-the-art technology, combined with traditional style, the
inside is pure delight of nineteenth century elegance: from the
magnificent decagonal skylight and the fireplace in the main salon, to the hot
tub in the owner’s suite, every part of this boat recalls the glorious years
of the Gilded Era, when sailing was born as an exclusive sport for gentlemen,
and them only.

References

1980s sailing yachts
1984 ships
Individual sailing yachts
Sailing yachts built in the United States
Sailing yachts of the United States